M. elegans may refer to:
 Madia elegans, a flowering plant species native to western North America
 Malurus elegans, the red-winged fairywren, a passerine bird species endemic to the southwestern corner of Western Australia
 Mantidactylus elegans, a frog species endemic to Madagascar
 Martensia elegans, a red alga species found in South African
 Merodon elegans, a fly species in the genus Merodon
 Mesochernes elegans, a pseudoscorpion species found in Venezuela
 Micropterix elegans, a moth species known from Israel
 Mutinus elegans, the elegant stinkhorn, the dog stinkhorn, the headless stinkhorn or the devil's dipstick, a fungus saprobic species found during summer and autumn in Europe and eastern North America
 Myristica elegans, a plant species in the genus Myristica

Synonyms 
 Marginella elegans, a synonym for Cryptospira elegans, a sea snail species